The Communist Party of Bohemia and Moravia (KSČM) held a leadership election on 15 May 2004. The incumbent leader Miroslav Grebeníček narrowly defeated Vojtěch Filip.

Result

Grebeníček was considered front-runner of the election. His victory was considered certain due to good electoral performances of the party, but his victory in the first round was surprisingly narrow and it was speculated that he might lose in the second round, but won and remained the leader of KSČM.

References

Communist Party of Bohemia and Moravia leadership elections
Communist Party of Bohemia and Moravia leadership election
Indirect elections
Communist Party of Bohemia and Moravia leadership election
Communist Party of Bohemia and Moravia leadership election